Eucalyptus olsenii, commonly known as the Woila gum, is a species of small tree that is endemic to a restricted area on the Southern Tablelands of New South Wales. It has smooth bark with rough bark on the lower trunk, lance-shaped to curved adult leaves, flower buds in groups of seven, white flowers and barrel-shaped or urn-shaped fruit.

Description
It has smooth white to cream-coloured bark that is shed in ribbons, sometimes with rough, fibrous or flaky bark at the base of the trunk. Flowering has been recorded in October and November and the flowers are white.
with the valves below the level of the rim.

Taxonomy and naming
Eucalyptus olsenii was first formally described in 1980 by Lawrie Johnsone and Don Blaxell in the journal Telopea. The specific epithet (olsenii) honours Ian Sinclair Olsen, who recognised the species as distinct on a bushwalking expedition led by Henry Fairlie-Cuninghame who collected the type material.

Distribution and habitat
Woila gum is restricted to mountains north east of Cooma and south of Braidwood, where it grows in woodland in poor soil on steep slopes. It also grows well as an ornamental tree.

References

olsenii
Myrtales of Australia
Trees of Australia
Flora of New South Wales
Plants described in 1980
Taxa named by Lawrence Alexander Sidney Johnson